The 1981 Azbakiyah bombing was a terrorist car bomb attack in the neighborhood of al-Azbakiyah, Damascus on 29 November 1981. The attack was blamed on the Muslim Brotherhood which was waging an insurrection against the government of Hafez al-Assad at the time.

However, a group calling itself the Organisation for the Liberation of Lebanon from Foreigners claimed responsibility for the bombing. It is believed to be the same group as the Israeli-backed Front for the Liberation of Lebanon from Foreigners, which was responsible for a series of bombings in Lebanon, which killed 146 people.

References

1981 murders in Syria
20th century in Damascus
20th-century mass murder in Asia
Attacks on buildings and structures in 1981
Attacks on buildings and structures in Damascus
Building bombings in Syria
Car and truck bombings in Syria
Improvised explosive device bombings in 1981
Improvised explosive device bombings in Damascus
Islamist uprising in Syria
Mass murder in 1981
Mass murder in Damascus
November 1981 crimes
November 1981 events in Asia
State-sponsored terrorism
Terrorist incidents in Syria in 1981